The Columbus mayoral election of 1991 was the 79th mayoral election in Columbus, Ohio.  It was held on Tuesday, November 5, 1991.  Republican party incumbent mayor Buck Rinehart retired from office after serving two consecutive terms.  Republican party nominee Greg Lashutka defeated Democratic party nominee Ben Espy.

References

Bibliography

Further reading

Mayoral elections in Columbus, Ohio
Columbus 
1991 Ohio elections